Vilija Sereikaitė (born 12 February 1987 in Panevėžys) is a Lithuanian racing cyclist. At the 2009, 2010 and 2011 UCI Track Cycling World Championships, Sereikaitė won the bronze medal in the individual pursuit.

Palmarès

Track

2006
3rd Individual Pursuit, Track World Cup Sydney
2007
2nd Individual Pursuit, Track World Cup Sydney
2008
1st  Individual Pursuit, UEC European U23 Track Championships
Track World Cup
1st Individual pursuit - Cali
2nd Individual pursuit - Ballerup
2009
Track World Cup
2nd Individual Pursuit, Beijing
 3rd Individual Pursuit Cali
 3rd Team Pursuit Cali
3rd, Individual Pursuit World Championships
1st  Individual Pursuit, UEC European U23 Track Championships
2010
Track World Cup
2nd Individual Pursuit, Beijing
3rd Individual Pursuit, World Championships
2011
1st Individual pursuit, Universiade
3rd Individual Pursuit, World Championships
2013
2nd Sprint, Panevezys
2014
3rd Individual Pursuit, UEC European Track Championships
3rd Individual Pursuit, Panevezys
2015
2nd Individual Pursuit, Panevezys

Road

External links 

1987 births
Living people
Cyclists at the 2008 Summer Olympics
Lithuanian female cyclists
Olympic cyclists of Lithuania
Sportspeople from Panevėžys
Lithuanian track cyclists
Universiade medalists in cycling
Universiade gold medalists for Lithuania
Medalists at the 2011 Summer Universiade